In South Africa, the terms township and location usually refer to the often underdeveloped racially segregated urban areas that, from the late 19th century until the end of apartheid, were reserved for non-whites, namely Black Africans, Coloureds and Indians. Townships were usually built on the periphery of towns and cities. The term township also has a distinct legal meaning in South Africa's system of land title, which carries no racial connotations.

Townships for non-whites were also called locations or lokasies in Afrikaans and are often still referred to by that name in smaller towns. The slang term "kasie/kasi", a popular short version of "lokasie" is also used. Townships sometimes have large informal settlements nearby.

History

Early development
During 1900-1950 (roughly), the majority of the black population in major urban areas lived in hostels or servants' accommodations provided by employers and were mostly single men. In the period during and following World War II urban areas of South Africa experienced a rapid period of urbanization as the colour bar was relaxed due to the war.  Neither employers nor the government built new accommodations or homes for the influx of new residents.  This led to overcrowding, poor living conditions, and the absence of amenities thereby contributing to high levels of crime and violence. High rents and overcrowding led to land invasions and the growth of shack settlements which were largely ignored by government.

By 1950 a large portion of the urban black population lived in townships.  In 1950, upwards of 100,000 people were living in townships on the Witwatersrand area, 50,000 people in Cato Manor in Durban, and an estimated 150,000 black and colored people lived in townships in Cape Town.

Living conditions in the shack township settlements were low but had the advantage over other more established options in the hostels of being cheap and largely unregulated by the apartheid era South African Police.

Apartheid: 1948–1994
During the era of ideological apartheid, black people were evicted from properties that were in areas designated as "white only" and forced to move into segregated townships. Separate townships were established for each of the three designated non-white race groups – black people, Coloureds and Indians – as per the Population Registration Act, 1950. Legislation that enabled the apartheid government to do this included the Group Areas Act.

Post-apartheid 
Most South African towns and cities have at least one township associated with them. Some old townships have seen rapid development since 1994 with, for instance, wealthy and middle-income areas sprouting in parts of Soweto and Chatsworth. Despite their origins in apartheid South Africa, today the terms township, location and informal settlement are not used pejoratively. However policy makers are, as in the 1950s, once again using the term 'slums' in a highly pejorative way.

Social issues

Township communities are faced with several social problems. Most often, the residents of townships do not own the land on which their houses are built. In effect, these houses are built illegally. Construction is informal and unregulated by the government. This results in a lack of access to basic services such as sewerage, electricity, roads, and clean water, which adversely affects residents' quality of life.

Infrastructure problems
Sewerage, water, and electrical Infrastructure within townships is often in need of repair, resulting in a lack of sanitation due to problems with accessibility, and availability. Electricity, water and sewerage are managed by different government departments, resulting in inefficiencies in the absence of substantial co-ordination at all stages of the project planning, budgeting, and implementation cycle.

Sewerage

The sewer systems within townships are poorly planned and constructed. The population of townships typically grows faster than the infrastructure was planned for, causing overloads that result in blockages, surges, and overflows. There are often a limited number of public toilets that are over-used, abused, and quickly become health hazards for the communities. Another issue is poor access to maintenance activities which is caused by the lack of space between houses. Some of the areas on the township peripheries or near riverbanks do not have access to facilities because they are not connected to the formal waterborne sewerage system.

Water
A consequence of inadequate pumping infrastructure and large populations is that water pressure in townships is very low. Each section of the townships is normally one pump per section. The water is used for everything from cleaning clothes, cooking, drinking, bathing, and cleaning the house. Having very little water accessible to each section makes it very hard to get enough water for a day per household.

Electricity
Electrical wires strung along the trees leading to power boxes is an ubiquitous sight in the townships, due to illegal electricity connections. This is dangerous, however every house in the area has a wire coming out of it and every wire is known by their owner in order to fix problems as soon as they arise. Most of the sub-stations are very unsecured to begin with so having so many additional wires coming off of it is very dangerous for the people nearby and the kids playing in the area. The electricity infrastructure has not undergone upgrades because of the government's disinclination to encourage power usage by non-residents.

Flood risk
Some townships, such as Alexandra and Diepsloot, are built near rivers, and on flood plains. These areas are extremely dense with only tortuous, narrow access, few communal water points and banks of chemical toilets on the peripheries of the settlements. The settlements are beginning to be built in the old tributaries due to the continuing growth of the townships. With the houses in the dried up tributaries is a potential problem when a large storm comes and the tributary starts to fill up with water again or if there is a backup of sewerage coming into the tributary. The houses built in that area are all in danger of being destroyed by natural occurrences. As the area grew the tributaries were piped and a number of concrete aprons and gullies were constructed over the tributary to which the communal water points drain. The gullies were then choked with garbage and the tributaries appear to be substantially blocked but this will not hold off the water for very long if a flood came through. Residents sometimes choose to build on river banks due to overcrowding in the belief that they would provide easy access to water and laundry facilities, however the water is unsuitable for these purposes due to pollution, and they are vulnerable to floods.

Backyard shacks
Backyard shacks are additional units on a plot of land that are rented out by the land owner for additional income. A plot of land designed for a house big enough for one family has turned into a plot of land that holds on average six families instead of one. These structures are illegally built in violation of planning and building codes and strain infrastructure. Governments are loath to act on backyard dwellings, doing to would result in a large-scale displacement of people. A 2001 study of the township called Diepsloot near Johannesburg showed that 24% of the residents lived in brick structures, 43% were in shack areas, and 27% were in backyard shacks.

Education

Township schools are often overcrowded, and lack adequate infrastructure. There is a high dropout rate of poor youth, particularly around Grade 9. Despite government interventions, education outcomes remain skewed, with township students continuing to under-perform. This skewed distribution is mainly attributable to higher and more rapid drop out rates among the poor, rather than to a lack of initial access to schooling. The formerly white schools uniformly produce better results and their governing bodies are able to raise substantial private funds used to get resources that are then unreachable by the rural and township schools which survive on the commitment of their teachers.

Gangs and violence
Gangs are a problem in townships, and children as young as 12 or 13 will begin initiation into a local gang. Some see violence and gangs as a way of life and a culture. The weapon of choice for most is a gun and with easy accessibility anyone is able to get one. It is estimated that out of the 14 million guns in circulation, in South Africa, only four million are registered and licensed to legal gun owners.

Largest townships
Largest townships in South Africa at the time of the 2011 census:

Legal meaning

The legal meaning of the term "township" in South Africa differs from the popular usage, and has a precise legal meaning without any racial connotations. The term is used in land titles and townships are subdivided into erfs (stands). "Township" can also mean a designated area or district, as part of a place name. For instance "Industrial Township" has been used in reference to an industrial area, e.g. "Westmead Industrial Township", in Pinetown, South Africa.

Often a township (in the legal sense) is established, and then adjoining townships, with the same name as the original township, and with a numbered "Extension" suffix are later established. For example, the Johannesburg suburb of Bryanston has an extension called Bryanston Extension 3.

Relationship with "suburb"
In traditionally or historically white areas, the term "suburb" is used for legally-defined residential townships in everyday conversation.

A suburb's boundaries are often regarded as being the same as the (legal) township boundaries, along with its numbered extensions, and it usually shares its name with the township (with some notable exceptions, such as the Johannesburg suburb known as Rivonia, which is actually the township of Edenburg with numbered extensions called Rivonia Extensions).

Occasionally formerly independent towns, such as Sandton (which itself consists of numerous suburbs), are referred to as "suburbs".

See also
List of townships in South Africa
HIV/AIDS in South African townships
Bantustan
Ghetto
Racial segregation
Township tourism
Old Location, a township of Windhoek, Namibia
Katutura, a township of Windhoek, Namibia

References

External links

Poverty in South Africa